Chlorochytrium is a genus of green algae, in the family Chlorochytriaceae.

Description
This Chlorochytrium sp. was found growing endophytically in the green alga Enteromorpha flexuosa. It is a genus in the division Chlorophyta.

Distribution

References

External links

Chlamydomonadales genera
Chlamydomonadales